Arichanna gaschkevitchii (or  in Japanese) is a species of geometrid moth native to Japan and commonly found throughout the country. This moth will store large amounts of grayanotoxins from the larval host plant in the body tissue to deter predators. The species was first described by Victor Motschulsky in 1860.

References

Boarmiini
Moths of Japan
Moths described in 1860
Taxa named by Victor Motschulsky